The 1990–91 season is FC Barcelona's 92nd season in existence and the club's 60th consecutive season in the top flight of Spanish football.

Squad

Transfers

In
Hristo Stoichkov from CSKA Sofia
Albert Ferrer from CD Tenerife
Nando from Sevilla CF
Ion Andoni Goikoetxea from Real Sociedad (loan ended)
Jesus Angoy from CD Logroñés (loan ended)

Out
Luis Milla to Real Madrid
Aloísio to FC Porto
Juan Carlos Unzué to Sevilla CF
Ernesto Valverde Tejedor to Athletic Bilbao

Competitions

La Liga

League table

Results by round

Matches

Copa del Rey

Eightfinals

Quarterfinals

Semifinals

European Cup Winners' Cup

First round

Eightfinals

Quarterfinals

Semifinals

Final

Supercopa

Friendlies

Statistics

Players statistics

External links

References

FC Barcelona seasons
Barcelona
Spanish football championship-winning seasons